Weedville is a populated place situated within the city limits of Peoria in Maricopa County, Arizona, United States. It was a small community founded in 1911, in an area which, at the time, was outside the city limits of Peoria. The area is located within the pockets of unincorporated land under the jurisdiction of Maricopa County. All of the census and demographic data for the residents of Weedville are part of the information reported for the city of Peoria, since Weedville is located within the limits of that city.

History
Reverend Ora Rush Weed (1868–1942) was a Methodist minister from Kansas. It is unknown why Weed decided to leave his hometown with his wife Phoebe and family. They moved and settled in Arizona. Some of the members of his Kansas ministry followed him and together they homesteaded the area north of Thunderbird Road and 75th Avenue, outside of what at the time were the city limits of Peoria.

By 1916, Weed established the Path Church (now known as the "Old Path Church") and a boarding school. The name "Paths" comes from a Bible verse (Jeremiah 6:16): "Stand ye in the ways, and see, and ask for the old paths, where is the good way, and walk therein, and ye shall find rest for your souls." A small religious community flourished around the development of Weedville, which Weed named after himself. By 1921, the community established a cemetery which was named the Old Paths Cemetery.
Besides running a small general store, Weed ran a farm which produced broom grass. He then established a broom factory using the broom grass. He employed many ex-convicts who had gained experience as broom makers in prison. As such the factory helped support the small community economically.

Later years
Weed donated land and buildings for the establishment of the Southwest Indian School. Today the site is home to the Southwest Indian School Ministries. The Old Path Church is still standing and is located within the grounds of the ministry. Rev. Ora Weed died on May 4, 1942. He and many of his descendants are buried in the Old Paths Cemetery which is located on the Old Paths Cemetery Road. The original bell of the Old Path Church is located within the grounds of the Old Paths Cemetery. The bell is rung every Veterans Day

Weedville is located in the area within 71st and 75th avenues. between Thunderbird Boulevard and Acoma Drive. The latitude is 33.614 and the longitude −112.215. The elevation of Weedville is 1,197 feet above mean sea level.

Historic structures of Weedville

Old Paths Cemetery

The Old Paths Cemetery is a small private cemetery located in "Weedville" and named for its founder Reverend Ora Weed. The cemetery is located north of the northeast corner of 73rd Ave. & Thunderbird Road. The majority of Weedville, including the Old Paths Cemetery, lies in unincorporated land. The cemetery has been maintained with care by the Weed family since its founding in 1921.

In pop culture
Arizona Republic writer Jim Cook had a chapter on Weedville in his 2002 book, "Arizona Liars Journal", published by Cowboy Miner Productions; .

See also

 List of historic properties in Peoria, Arizona
 Indian Mesa
 Rio Vista Pond

References

Further reading
 Gilbert, Kathleen  (2004) More Than A Century of Peoria People, Progress, and Pride (Heritage Publishers)  
 Historic Peoria Places – Weedville – City of Peoria

External links

1911 establishments in Arizona Territory
 
Populated places in the Sonoran Desert
Phoenix metropolitan area
Cemeteries in Arizona